Chōsen Shrine (Hanja: 朝鮮神宮; Japanese Hepburn: Chōsen Jingū) was the most important Shinto shrine in Korea from 1925 to 1945, during the period of Japanese rule. It was destroyed in 1945. 

The famous architect and architectural historian Itō Chūta, also responsible for Meiji Jingū, contributed to its planning.

Background
After the annexation of Korea in 1910, the Japanese government embarked upon a policy of Japanization. This included worship at Shintō shrines, as much a political expression of patriotism as a religious act. From 1925, school pupils were required to attend Shinto shrines, and in 1935 it became compulsory for university students and government employees to attend Shinto ceremonies. By 1945, there were a total of 1,140 shrines in Korea associated with State Shinto.

Chōsen Jingū was erected in 1925 on the peak of Nanzan mountain in Keijō and was dedicated to Amaterasu and Emperor Meiji. It was constructed in the shinmei-zukuri style of Ise Jingū. Chōsen Jingū was demolished in October 1945, two months after Japan's defeat in World War II, and in 1970 the "Patriot An Chung-gun Memorial Hall" was constructed on the site of the former shrine, in honour of An Chung-gun, the assassin of Itō Hirobumi, the first Japanese Resident-General.

See also
State Shinto
Shinto in Korea
Korea under Japanese rule
Modern system of ranked Shinto Shrines

References

External links
 Chōsen Jingū (plan and photographs)
1931 photograph 

Kanpei-taisha
Korea under Japanese rule
Shinto shrines in Korea
Jingū
Buildings and structures demolished in 1945
Buildings and structures completed in 1925
Demolished buildings and structures in South Korea
20th-century Shinto shrines